Fanene Leifi Pita Maivia (born Fanene Pita Anderson; April 6, 1937 – June 13, 1982), better known as Peter Maivia, was a Samoan-American professional wrestler, actor and stunt coordinator. Maivia was the grandfather of Dwayne "The Rock" Johnson via adoption, and was also part of the famous Anoa'i family via blood brother pact. He was also a promoter for the National Wrestling Alliance in Hawaii.

Professional wrestling career

Early career (1962–1964)
Maivia made his debut in 1962 at the age of 24. He worked for NWA Hawaii, and in other places including France, and the United Kingdom.

New Zealand and Australia (1964–1968)
After spending his first twenty years in American Samoa, Maivia moved to New Zealand. He began competing, wrestling not as The High Chief, but as Prince Peter Maivia. Athletic, naturally talented and quick to learn, Maivia received training in New Zealand, under the watchful eye of local wrestler and promoter Steve Rickard.

Both in and out of the ring, Rickard taught the young Samoan a great deal about professional wrestling, and under his guidance, Maivia developed at an amazing rate. On August 3, 1964, after less than a year in the business, the rookie sensation stunned New Zealand by defeating Rickard to win the prestigious New Zealand Heavyweight Championship. The title victory was impressive, however Maivia's reign was extremely short, and he held the championship for just three days, dropping the championship back to Rickard on August 6, 1964. The point had been made though, and from that point onward, Maivia enjoyed main-event status in the NWA's New Zealand territory.

Later in 1964, Maivia followed up his previous success by winning the NWA Australasian Heavyweight Championship. Maivia became the new Australasian champion by defeating Kangaroo Kennedy, and he carried the belt for four years before finally losing it to Steve Rickard in 1968. After developing his repertoire and ring skills in New Zealand, Maivia slowly began to branch out and take bookings in larger promotions, with success invariably following the popular islander.

Various promotions (1968–1977)
Maivia continued working mainly in Hawaii during most of his career. In 1968 he worked for International Wrestling Enterprise in Japan. From 1969 to 1975 he worked in NWA San Francisco, NWA Hollywood, WCCW, Houston Wrestling, and the AWA winning many championships in the process.

World Wide Wrestling Federation (1977–1981)

He joined the World Wide Wrestling Federation in mid-1977. He was one of the company's biggest stars, working matches with many top wrestlers such as Superstar Billy Graham, Ivan Putski and Bob Backlund. He turned heel for the first time in his career in 1978 on Backlund in a match against Spiros Arion and Victor Rivera. During his tenure in the WWWF, he also competed in Hawaii, Japan, Toronto, Detroit, San Francisco, Los Angeles and New Zealand. He left the WWWF, which had now been renamed to the WWF, in 1981.

Later career (1981–1982)
After leaving the WWF, Maivia returned to California and won the NWA Americas Heavyweight Championship. He wrestled in his last match in Hawaii in February 1982 defeating Victor Rivera in a singles match. He retired on February 11, 1982, due to his battle with cancer.

Personal life
Maivia, also known as the Flying Hawaiian, was of the Ali'i lineage of Malietoa. Maivia's traditional Samoan tattoos, which covered his abdomen and legs, were a symbol of his High Chief status. According to Superstar Billy Graham, they were completed in three days. His wife Ofelia Fuataga, more commonly known as Lia Maivia, was one of the first female professional wrestling promoters. He also adopted Lia's daughter Ata.

Maivia disapproved of his daughter's relationship with Rocky Johnson because he was a wrestler. The duo married despite Maivia's disapproval. His two sons, Jarrod Holbrook and Peter Jr., are also wrestlers; mostly wrestling in Hawaii and West Coast based promotions.

Maivia was the blood brother of Amituanai Anoa'i, the father of the Wild Samoans (Afa and Sika), and thus the Anoa'i family regard the Maivia family as part of their own family.

Maivia was also an actor, appearing in the fifth James Bond film, You Only Live Twice, where he played a driver who transports a disguised Bond to Osato headquarters. His character also fights Bond, is hit with a sofa, wields a katana, and is put down when a statue is broken on his head. He was also the film's stunt fight co-ordinator.

Death
In 1981, Maivia was diagnosed with inoperable cancer, having reportedly ignored symptoms along with his friends and family's admonitions to see a doctor. He died on June 13, 1982, at the age of 45.

Maivia was inducted into the WWE Hall of Fame, along with his son-in-law Rocky Johnson, in 2008 by his grandson Dwayne Johnson; with the award being accepted on his behalf by his daughter Ata Maivia-Johnson.

Legacy 
In the 2016 Disney animated film, Moana, the character design of Maui was derived from photographs of Peter Maivia, according to interviews with his grandson, Dwayne "The Rock" Johnson, who voices Maui in the film.

Filmography
You Only Live Twice (1967) - Dodge driver

Championships and accomplishments
50th State Big Time Wrestling
NWA Hawaii Heavyweight Championship (1 time)
NWA Hawaii Tag Team Championship (4 times) - with Jim Hady (1), Billy White Wolf (1), and Sam Steamboat (2)
NWA All-Star Pro Wrestling
NWA Australasian Heavyweight Championship (2 times)
NWA New Zealand Heavyweight Championship (1 time)
NWA Big Time Wrestling
NWA Texas Heavyweight Championship (2 times)
NWA Hollywood Wrestling
NWA Americas Heavyweight Championship (1 time)
NWA "Beat the Champ" Television Championship (2 times)
NWA New Zealand
NWA New Zealand British Empire Commonwealth Heavyweight Championship (2 times)
NWA San Francisco
NWA United States Heavyweight Championship (San Francisco version) (2 times)
NWA World Tag Team Championship (San Francisco version) (1 time) - with Ray Stevens
Professional Wrestling Hall of Fame
Class of 2016
World Wrestling Entertainment
WWE Hall of Fame (Class of 2008)

See also

 List of premature professional wrestling deaths

Notes

References

External links
 
 

1937 births
1982 deaths
20th-century professional wrestlers
American people of Samoan descent
American professional wrestlers of Samoan descent
American Samoan male professional wrestlers
American sportspeople of Samoan descent
Anoa'i family
Deaths from cancer in Hawaii
Professional wrestling trainers
Professional wrestling promoters
Professional Wrestling Hall of Fame and Museum
WWE Hall of Fame inductees
NWA "Beat the Champ" Television Champions
NWA Americas Heavyweight Champions
PWF United States Heavyweight Champions